At the 1936 Winter Olympics, one individual Nordic combined event was contested. It was held on Wednesday, February 12, 1936 (cross-country skiing) and on Thursday, February 13, 1936 (ski jumping).

Medalists

Results

Cross-country skiing

The 18 kilometre cross-country skiing race was held on Wednesday, February 12, 1936, as part of the special 18 kilometre cross-country race.

The race started at 10:01 a.m. There was a gap of 30 seconds between each starter. The highest point was at 1010 metres and the lowest point was at 735 metres. The conditions were good with temperatures between -4.8° to -2° Celsius.

Oddbjørn Hagen the winner of this Nordic combined cross-country skiing race won for his performance also a silver medal in the competition of the specialists. In total 16 competitors participated in both events and were also placed in the separate 18 kilometre race.

Final standings

Participating nations
A total of 51 Nordic combined skiers from 16 nations competed at the Garmisch-Partenkirchen Games:

References

External links
International Olympic Committee results database
Official Olympic Report
 

 
1936 Winter Olympics events
1936
1936 in Nordic combined
Nordic combined competitions in Germany
Men's events at the 1936 Winter Olympics